The Doctrine of Labyrinths is a series of fantasy novels by Sarah Monette. It is set in the secondary world of Meduse and tells the story of the adventures of the wizard Felix Harrowgate and his half-brother, former assassin Mildmay the Fox. The series is made up of Mélusine, The Virtu, The Mirador, and Corambis.

Major characters
Mildmay Foxe (Mildmay the Fox)
Felix Harrowgate
Mehitabel Parr

Minor characters

Vey Coruscant

Last and greatest pupil of Brinvillier Strych. She practiced blood witchcraft, a form of wizardry outlawed by the Cabaline School. There isn't much known about blood witchcraft except blood and death are used to focus and power the spells. Participants are always asked before being used. Although she never becomes a main character, fear of her permeates the lower city. She is killed by Mildmay the Fox in The Virtu.

Malkar Gennadion

Wizard, affiliated with no formal School of wizardry.  Former master, lover and torturer of Felix Harrowgate, on whom he had cast the obligation de sang. It's theorized that he used the 'binding by blood' to circumvent the protection wards that all wizards of the Mirador have in order to use Felix to break The Virtu  and burn the palace (Mélusine, 2005).

Bernard Heber

Illegitimate half-brother and man-at-arms of Mavortian von Heber.  Initially considers Felix to be no more than a nutcase, and has a prickly relationship with Mildmay, with whom he can yet work harmoniously when need requires.

Mavortian von Heber

Wizard of the Fressandran School from Norvena Magna; practitioner of divination using the Sibylline, cards akin to the Tarot.  One-time employer of Mildmay the Fox.  He might have been a fairly decent fellow if not for the monomania that consumes him—the desire for revenge against Beaumont Livy, an evil wizard who seduced his fiancée, bringing about her death many years ago.

Robert of Hermione

Brother of Stephen Teverius' late wife.  A wizard of mediocre ability and an enemy of Felix.

Keeper (Kolkhis)

Mildmay's former thief-keeper, lover, and trainer in the art of assassination.  He escaped her at around age 17-18, but memories of her continue to haunt his nightmares.

Thaddeus de Lalage

Wizard, formerly of the Eusebian School in the Bastion.  After defecting to the Mirador, converted to the Cabaline School.  One-time friend of Felix, and enemy of Gideon Thraxios.

Cardenio Richey

A cade-skiff, or river-dragger, and best friend of Mildmay the Fox.

Shannon Teverius

Younger half-brother of Stephen and Victoria, and lover of Felix; however, their relationship was severed after Felix's ignominious past as a teenage whore was revealed to the court.

Stephen Teverius

Lord Protector of Marathat, succeeding his father Gareth and grandmother Jane.

Victoria Teveria

Wizard of the Cabaline school in the Mirador, and sister of the Lord Protector.

Gideon Thraxios

Wizard of the Eusebian School in the Bastion.  Defected to the Mirador but not accepted as a Cabaline.  Lover of Felix.

Thamuris

Troian wizard and Celebrant Celestial of the Euryganeic Covenant, now dying of consumption.  Practitioner of divination using Pythian casting.  Friend of Mildmay and later of Felix.

Ginevra Thomson

A beautiful shop-girl and the discarded mistress of a Melusinien nobleman.  Having hired Mildmay to steal back the jewels the nobleman had given her, she subsequently became his lover.

Historical Persons of Interest

Gloria Aestia

Second wife of Gareth Teverius, and mother of Shannon Teverius. The only annemer in the history of Marathat to be burnt for treason.

The Cordelii

The last reigning Kings of Marathat, comprising Paul, Matthias, Sebastian, Edmund, Laurence, Charles, Claudius, Jasper, and John, who was killed in a revolution that brought his cousin, Michael Teverius, to power.  The crypt of the Cordelii, in the Mirador, figures in each of the first three books.

Porphyria Levant

A blood-witch, known to have cast the obligation d'âme on a man named Silas Altamont.

Brinvillier Strych

A blood wizard, mainly known for his assassination of Jane Teveria.  Pupil of Porphyria Levant.

Gareth Teverius

Son of Jane Teveria, and father of Stephen Teverius and Victoria Teveria (by Dulcinea Polydoria), and Shannon Teverius (by Gloria Aestia).

Jane Teveria

Mother of Lord Gareth Teverius, and therefore grandmother of Victoria Teveria, Stephen Teverius and Shannon Teverius. Burnt to death by Brinvillier Strych in the Hall of Chimeras in the Mirador.

Places of interest

The Bastion

The center of power of the Kekropian empire, and home of the Eusebian wizards, rivals and enemies of the Cabalines.  Once the sister citadel to the Mirador, it houses the only remaining Titan Clock in existence.

Corambis

The Gardens of Nephele

Kekropia

The Norvenas

Magna and Parva, they are countries that lie far to the north of Mélusine.  Norvenan wizards follow the Fressandran school of magic.

Marathat

Formerly a kingdom, now a protectorate ruled by the Lord Protector.  Geographically it lies west of the Kekropian Empire and east of the Coeurterre, and is in constant danger of being subsumed by one or other of its more powerful neighbors.

Mélusine

The capital of Marathat.

The Mirador

The center of power of Marathat and of Mélusine, it is part citadel, part palace, and part research institute for the Cabaline wizards.  Immensely old in places, it is notable for having no windows.  Its central audience hall-cum-throne room, the Hall of the Chimeras, also houses the Virtu, a magical artifact that concentrates the wizards' power and is the chief safeguard of the city.

Troia

A country across the eastern sea, in ancient times the center of an empire that extended to Kekropia.  Troian wizards are especially skilled at healing.  Troian people are of a distinct physical type: tall and slender, with pale skin, red hair, and yellow eyes; Troians have no facial hair.

External links
 Sarah Monette's official site
 Interview with Sarah Monette at wotmania

Fantasy novel series
Ace Books books